Pheropsophus kimaniae, colloquially known as the Asian bombardier beetle (miidera beetle in Japan) is a species of ground beetle from Japan, North and South Korea, and the province of Yunnan, China.

References

Beetles described in 1862
Brachininae
Beetles of Asia
Taxa named by August Morawitz